The women's 1500 metres event at the 1997 Summer Universiade was held on 30 and 31 August at the Stadio Cibali in Catania, Italy.

Medalists

Results

Heats

Final

References

Athletics at the 1997 Summer Universiade
1997 in women's athletics
1997